Oorlagh Marie George (born July 7, 1980) is a filmmaker. In 2012, she was nominated for, and won, an Academy Award in the category Short Film (Live Action) as a producer of her father Terry George's film The Shore.

As of February 2020 George was making Stranger With A Camera, a film about a troubled American teenager stranded in a village in the Mourne Mountains of Northern Ireland.

References

External links

Living people
1980 births
Northern Ireland emigrants to the United States
American film producers
Producers who won the Live Action Short Film Academy Award